Paya Terubong is a state constituency in Penang, Malaysia, that has been represented in the Penang State Legislative Assembly since 1974. It covers two suburbs of George Town - Paya Terubong and parts of Air Itam - both at the centre of Penang Island.

The state constituency was created in the 1974 redistribution and is mandated to return a single Assemblyman to the Penang State Legislative Assembly under the first-past-the-post voting system. , the State Assemblyman for Paya Terubong is Yeoh Soon Hin from the DAP, which is part of the state's ruling coalition, Pakatan Harapan (PH).

In terms of population size, Paya Terubong is the largest state constituency in Penang, with 46,741 registered voters within this constituency alone . Concerns have been raised by the locals about the lopsided population disparity between the Paya Terubong constituency and the other, less populated seats in Penang, and the perceived malapportionment of the state seats.

Definition
The Paya Terubong constituency encompasses the entire Paya Terubong suburb, as well as the southern part of the Air Itam suburb, specifically the neighbourhood of Farlim. It is partly bounded to the north by the Dondang River; the portion of Air Itam north of the river falls under the neighbouring Air Itam constituency.

To the south of the island's central valleys, the neighbourhood of Relau also falls under this constituency.

Polling districts 
According to the federal gazette issued on 30 March 2018, the Paya Terubong constituency is divided into 11 polling districts.

Demographics

History

Election results
The electoral results for the Paya Terubong state constituency in 2008, 2013 and 2018 are as follows.

See also 
 Constituencies of Penang

References

Penang state constituencies